Isabel Natividad Díaz Ayuso (born 17 October 1978) is a Spanish politician and journalist serving as the president of the Community of Madrid since 2019. She is the president of the People's Party of Madrid.

A member of the People's Party, and the vice-secretary of communication and spokeswoman of the party's Madrilenian branch, she was the regional candidate for president of the Community of Madrid ahead of the [2019 Madrilenian autonomous election. Although her party lost the autonomous elections for the first time since May 1991, she was later elected president by the Assembly of Madrid. Her administration represented several firsts: it was the first time that the region was run by a coalition government—formed by Ayuso's own conservative People's Party (PP) and Citizens—and it was the first time that Vox propped up an autonomous executive in Madrid.

Personal life 
Born on 17 October 1978 in Madrid in the Chamberí district, her parents were involved in the trade of medical and orthopaedic goods. She has a degree in journalism from the Complutense University of Madrid (UCM) and a master's degree in Political Communication and Protocol. Her partner between 2016 and 2020, was the hairdresser Jairo Alonso.

During the COVID-19 pandemic in Spain, she announced on 16 March 2020 that she had tested positive for the disease.

Isabel Ayuso was baptized as a Catholic but became irreligious at 9 years old after her grandfather's death. During the COVID-19 pandemic, she returned to the Catholic faith, stressing the importance of seeing people pray for her well-being.

She is a co-owner of a property management business she inherited from her father.

Political career 
Affiliated to the Popular Party (PP) in 2005, when Pablo Casado was the president of New Generations in Madrid, in 2006, she was hired by Alfredo Prada, Minister of Justice and the Interior of the Government of the Community of Madrid, for his press department, gaining the confidence of Esperanza Aguirre. Specialized in political communication, she directed the online area of the PP, taking charge of Cristina Cifuentes' digital campaign in 2015.

A candidate on the PP list for the 2011 Madrid Assembly elections, she was not elected as a Member of Parliament at the time. She entered the ninth legislature of the regional parliament on 15 July, filling the vacancy caused by Engracia Hidalgo's resignation. She renewed her act as a deputy in the 2015 elections. During the X legislature she served as deputy spokesperson for her group, a position she abandoned along with her status as a deputy when she was appointed vice-counselor of the Presidency and Justice of the regional government.

On 11 January 2019, PP president Pablo Casado appointed her to lead the party in the 2019 Madrilenian regional election. In that election on 26 May, the PP list obtained 22.23% of valid votes and 30 seats, the second most voted list after the PSOE, with 27.31% of valid votes and 37 seats.

Presidency of the Community of Madrid 

Proposed as a candidate for the Presidency of the Community of Madrid by the President of the Assembly of Madrid, Juan Trinidad, who had previously prevented an investiture session for Ángel Gabilondo by scheduling an investiture session without a candidate in July 2019, Díaz Ayuso was sworn in as President of the regional government on August 14, with 68 votes in favour (corresponding to members of the Popular, Citizens' and Vox parliamentary groups in Madrid) and 64 against (corresponding to members of the Socialist, Más Madrid and United We Can-Madrid en Pie parliamentary groups).

In January 2020, she hired Miguel Ángel Rodríguez as chief of staff. Her vice president, Ignacio Aguado, then explained his disagreement with the decision.

Six months after her inauguration as President of the Community of Madrid, the COVID-19 pandemic reached Spain with special virulence in the Community of Madrid. In accordance with the state of alarm decreed by the Spanish government on 14 March 2020, the government of the Community of Madrid, like the other autonomous communities, took immediate measures [required clarification] such as the closure of schools and leisure centres, shows and sports events, retired people's day centres, religious celebrations, the closure of hotels and tourist accommodation, shops considered not to be of basic need and the limitation of travel to those needed to go to work or buy food. It also adopted protection measures in public transport, and tax reductions in the payment of Business Tax (IAE) and Property Tax (IBI) for leisure, hotel and commercial premises, travel agencies and large stores, on the condition that they maintain the jobs until the end of the year. Presential activity was suspended in all Community Citizen Service offices, and remote work was encouraged.

In view of the saturation of hospital services, Ayuso's government used the ferial enclosure IFEMA as an emergency hospital, which disposed of 5,500 hospital beds in order to attend all patients. IFEMA hospital was built in record time, less than 2 weeks, and the idea of the emergency hospital gave birth to the future Zendal Hospital, inaugurated a few months later. Hotels in Madrid were also used to look after less sick patients. Ayuso stopped appearing before the Madrid Assembly on 5 March 2020, and the chamber was closed for more than a month.

Ayuso was criticised for delivering high-quality FFP2 and FFP3 protective masks to the citizens of the Community of Madrid for free, which arguably could provoke that these kind of masks became scarce in hospitals – it later was revealed that hospitals were also well supplied with this equipment. In May 2020, during the coronavirus pandemic in Spain, her Director General of Public Health, Yolanda Fuentes, resigned, disagreeing with Ayuso's decision to request the transfer from phase 0 to phase 1 of the confinement, because it was not based on "health criteria", a position Ayuso reportedly took after a meeting with businessmen.

Ayuso opposed the request of her coalition partners, Citizens party, for the army to intervene in retirement homes. However, the army did so, against her own criteria, finding corpses and people "in extreme situations and in poor sanitary conditions.

In October 2020, Alberto Reyero, the regional minister responsible for nursing homes announced his resignation, wishing "good luck and success in the task that she has ahead" to Díaz Ayuso. He also mentioned that "the unity of the institutions is the most successful way to defeat the virus", criticizing the confrontation between the regional and national administrations. However, six days later, the central government approved the State of Alarm for the Community of Madrid following unsuccessful talks and confrontation between Díaz Ayuso and PM Pedro Sánchez. On 20 October 2020, two health officials of the Ayuso administration (the manager of Primary Attention and the manager of Hospitals) handed in their resignation.

On 1 December 2020, Díaz Ayuso inaugurated the Hospital Isabel Zendal, praised by her government but heavily criticised by the opposition for its cost overruns and its use as an "advertising campaign".

After Storm Filomena, the opposition criticised her government performance, accusing it of "lack of anticipation" against the incidences caused by the storm, that seriously damaged some infrastructure and parks in the region as well as trapping many citizens of the region for a whole night on the road, with snow reaching it some points more than 50 centimeters.

On 10 March 2021, following an announcement by the Spanish Socialist Workers' Party (PSOE) and Citizens (Cs) to bring down the People's Party-led government in the Region of Murcia, she announced the breakup of her alliance with Cs in her own region and called a snap election in the Community of Madrid scheduled for 4 May. However, both the PSOE and Más Madrid preventively filled motions of no confidence in an attempt to thwart Ayuso's move.

She approves tax reform in April 2021 to lower the estate and gift tax.

Following her party's victory in the May elections, she was able to form a new government of the People's Party of the Community of Madrid with the external support of Vox, after her former colleagues of Citizens failed to gain a single seat.

On 31 August 2021, she announced her intention to contest the leadership of the regional branch of the party, a position left vacant since the resignation of former President Cristina Cifuentes.

In February 2022, Spanish media revealed Diaz Ayuso’s People’s Party made repeated attempts to illegally spy on her in the hope of obtaining sensitive information and blackmailing her out of the race to seize control of the Madrid branch of the party. The party’s federal leadership closed in on then-unreleased allegations Ayuso’s brother was involved in € 1.5 M worth of healthcare material purchased by her administration at the height of the COVID-19 pandemic in April 2020 in Spain. When disclosed, she reacted by insisting her brother’s business deals were performed according to law and received no special treatment, whilst publicly accusing her party’s top officials of conspiring against her. The scandal was sealed with the resignation of both PP President Pablo Casado and Deputy President García Egea, Ayuso herself managing to survive relatively unscathed and emboldened in her bid for the party’s leadership in Madrid.

Between 200,000 and 670,000 demonstrators gather on November 13, 2022 in Madrid to defend the public health system in the region and against a proposed reform of the sector. The demonstration is aimed at the health policies of Isabel Diaz Ayuso, who wants to develop public-private partnerships and restructure the community care system. According to the unions, these services have been under pressure for several years, due to a lack of resources and personnel, and to poor regional management.

Political positions 

In April 2019 she claimed the night traffic jams as a "hallmark" of the city of Madrid, lamenting their disappearance with the start-up of Madrid Central. Later, in an interview with El País, she clarified that "... I love the nightlife here, I have lived it with intensity. I hate traffic jams: I hate them. I just miss that nightlife and everyone has understood what I meant". Ayuso, who broke in as leader of the PP candidacy with a harsh speech, close to that of José María Aznar, Esperanza Aguirre and Pablo Casado, had declared to be "next to Vox, not in front of it".

In the same month of April, when she was already the candidate for the presidency of the Community of Madrid, she proposed that children conceived but not born yet to be counted as members of family units for the purpose of applying for social aid or school places. She did not clarify whether these aids would be maintained in the event that the baby was not born.

In February 2020, she considered that the LGBT law of the Community of Madrid approved by her predecessor in office – who also belonged to the People's Party and of which she herself voted in favour – was a consequence of the "tyrannical progressivism" and that, if it were up to her, "some articles would have to be repealed".

She joined a chorus of politicians, including Spain's Socialist Prime Minister Pedro Sánchez, that repudiated the demand for an apology for colonialism by the President of Mexico, Andrés Manuel López Obrador. Ayuso accused the Mexican President of instigating an "indigenism that is the new communism", and later said that indigenous movements across Latin America were promoting "a simplistic revision of Spanish history", the wrecking of "Spain's legacy in the Americas … [such as] the mixing and fusion of cultures that have forged such strong Atlantic links", and that Spain "took Spanish and ... Catholicism, and therefore civilisation and freedom, to the American continent”. She further disagreed with Pope Francis's statement that the Catholic Church should ask forgiveness for its actions in Mexico.

Some of her positions and comments have strained relations with her government partners, Ciudadanos, which have led to an early election.

Regarding climate change, she says it "has always existed" and dismissed "apocalyptic claims" as part of a "communist plot".

She is neoliberal on economic issues.

Acknowledgments 
In September 2021 Ayuso was awarded the Bruno Leoni Prize in recognition of the policies implemented by the Community of Madrid to contrast the COVID-19 epidemic, avoiding indiscriminate lockdowns and aiming at preserving individual freedoms and economic activities. The Prize is awarded by Istituto Bruno Leoni, an Italian classical-liberal think tank. This was the first instance of a government personality being selected while in office. Previously, the prize had been awarded to personalities such as Nobel laureates Vernon L. Smith and Mario Vargas Llosa, academics (Richard Pipes and Deirdre McCloskey), and democracy activists (Leopoldo Lòpez and Canan Arin).

Electoral history

References 

1978 births
Complutense University of Madrid alumni
Conservatism in Spain
Living people
Spanish Roman Catholics
Converts to Roman Catholicism from atheism or agnosticism
Politicians from Madrid
People's Party (Spain) politicians
Presidents of the Community of Madrid
Members of the 9th Assembly of Madrid
Members of the 10th Assembly of Madrid
Members of the People's Parliamentary Group (Assembly of Madrid)
Members of the 11th Assembly of Madrid
Members of the 12th Assembly of Madrid
21st-century Spanish women politicians
Vice-ministers of the Community of Madrid
Women presidents of the autonomous communities of Spain